Disney's Pooh & Friends is a book series based on the Pooh stories by A. A. Milne, along with the Lessons from the Hundred Acre Wood series.

Characters 
Pooh - The star of the book series
Piglet - Pooh's best friend
Kanga - A nice kangaroo in the series
Roo - Kanga's joey
Rabbit - A rabbit in the series, who gets mad when Tigger bounces on his prized garden
Tigger - Pooh's bouncy friend with stripes both orange and black.
Eeyore - Pooh's donkey friend who gets very glum at certain times
Owl - A bird that's sort of like a teacher
Christopher Robin - The eight-year-old boy in the series with toy animals

Books 
 Pooh, the Bouncing Bear: Kanga, Roo, and Tigger teach Pooh how to bounce but he isn't very good at it.
 Roo's Best Gift: Roo's friends watch him, and decide to bring things to his holiday party, but Roo is being destructive, and ruins them, but on the day of the party, Kanga gives them their gifts all fixed at the holiday party.
 Piglet To The Rescue: Piglet is tired of being little, so Pooh gives him a new name: "Biglet".
 Tigger Bounces In To Fall: Pooh and his friends look for Tigger, who is nowhere to be seen in the Hundred-Acre-Wood.
 Rabbit's Perfect Party: Rabbit wants to have a perfect birthday party, this year, but realizes, as long as his friends are there, it's perfect.
 Eeyore and the Balloon Tree: Spring comes to the Hundred-Acre-Wood, and Christopher Robin has a picnic to celebrate and the big surprise is balloons, but when Eeyore's balloon pops he is very sad, and he thinks he can plant a balloon tree.

References

See also

 List of Winnie the Pooh characters

Winnie-the-Pooh characters